Altered is a former National Hot Rod Association (NHRA) drag racing class and a current drag racing chassis configuration that forms the basis of many classes of NHRA Competition Eliminator.

The altered is "[s]ometimes called the poor man's [d]ragster".  While the emblematic altered is a short-wheelbase roadster with exposed engine and front frame rails, very similar to the earliest rail dragsters, altereds can be bodied cars also.

By definition, altereds were essentially stock gas, alcohol, or nitromethane-class cars with parts removed or changed, making them ineligible for the previous class, such as Keith Ferrell's Dogcatcher, a 1936 Willys sedan delivery; built as a gasser, Ferrell deliberately left something off to run it in B/Altered.

History
The Altered category originated "for cars with moderate changes", according to the rulebook.  It developed from out of the Hot Roadster, Fuel Coupé, and Fuel Sedan categories.  In 1956, it was divided in three classes by weight break:  A (up to ), B, and C ( and up). Rules allowed moving the engine back up to 25% of the wheelbase, as well as chopping and channeling, which were prohibited in gassers.  The class had few limits or requirements.  One of the pioneers was Walt's Puffer II, an unsupercharged A/Altered Fiat Topolino powered by a 392 hemi, driven by Walt Knoch.

Of the early altereds, the #554 A Fuel Coupé (A/FC), a '34 five-window, was "[u]ndoubtedly the most famous". The #554 Coupé was powered by a supercharged  hemi (a  block) on between 40% and 75% nitro. It routinely filled the cockpit with smoke and burned rubber and clutch dust; track marshals once asked Faust if he needed help after exiting the smoking car, to which Faust casually replied, "Why? This thing does this all the time."

In 1957, NHRA banned nitro in all categories; the American Hot Rod Association (AHRA) still allowed it, and Fuel Dragsters (FD), Hot Roadsters (HR), and Fuel Coupés (FC), in the days before Funny Car, went there instead:  it would be Drag News and their Standard 1320 record which christened them Fuel Altereds. AHRA grouped coupés and roasters together, unlike NHRA, under Hot Car Eliminator (HCE). Independent drag strips, not NHRA sanctioned, offered venues for the fuel racers. Smokers Car Club hosted the first U.S. Fuel and Gas Championship at Famoso Raceway in March 1959.

Early in the 1960s, as supercharging proliferated, NHRA added AA/A, BB/A, and CC/A.  In 1956, the A/A class record holder, "Jazzy Jim" Nelson's '47 Topolino, was so quick, it would face dragsters in Top Eliminator at the end of meet.

Supercharged A fuel altereds, or AA/FAs, are exemplified by the famous Pure Heaven, Pure Hell, and Rat Trap.

Winged Express, piloted by "Wild Willie" Borsch, is "arguably is the most famous fuel altered of all time". The car was built for AA/A in 1961 by Phil Johnson, and converted to AA/FA specification in 1963. It continued to race into 1970.

Lynn and Dave Hough, with driver Ed Moore, from San Bernardino, California, built Nanook I in the 1960s, an unusual long-wheelbase altered, bodied as a 1929 Model A, powered by a  Oldsmobile. They were given a blown hemi by Charlie Brent (after he wrecked his AA/FD), and built Nanook II around it, enabling the car to exceed  at Orange County International Raceway  The car was turned into a jigsaw puzzle, now "highly collectible" among drag racing fans, by Hallmark Cards. In 1975, the Houghs made an arrangement with the Super Shops retail chain in Southern California to build Nanook 4, with a '23 T body over a Norm Porter chassis and Ed Pink-built engine. After the giveaway, the Houghs moved up to Funny Car for a short time, before retiring. They returned in 2001 with Nanook 6, a perfect copy of their excellent AA/FA, Nanook 3.

Moore also drove the AA/FA The Mob, teamed with Phil Miller.  The duo created several versions of the supercharged A fuel car, "and were a significant part of the West Coast Fuel Altered scene" in the early 1970s.

This led to an exclusive Fuel Altereds Nationals in Tucson, Arizona, in 1976, attended by the likes of Dave "Nasty" Benjamin and Jimmy West.

Dennis Geisler campaigned the Instant T fuellie, then moved up to Funny Car, driving for a number of owners before fielding his own car in 1978.

Based in Phoenix, Arizona, West ran the Chevrolet-powered Wild Wild West AA/FA; his brother, Johnny, ran a similar car in the middle 1970s.

Fitzgerald and Eskelson would be joined by R. T. Reed and Richard Rockman, at Fitzgeralds's Anaheim Speed Engineers shop, in producing their most famous creation, the AA/FA match racer Pure Heaven, starting in 1965. Fitzgerald would drive this car in dozens of meetings against Pure Hell, driven by Dale Emery (for car owner Rich Guasco). Pure Heaven II would run on opening day of the new Orange County Raceway (now OCIR) on 5 August that year.

There was crossover between classes. For instance, Dan Parker turned a Logghe ex-Funny Car chassis, with a fiberglass reproduction Bantam body, into a B/Econo Altered for racing in Competition Eliminator.

Altereds were highly popular in the 1960s and 1970s. Despite the popularity of Altereds, NHRA eliminated the Altered Eliminator category in 1972, and eventually moved them into the NHRA's Competition Eliminator category which features any number of cars.  There are over 40 classes of Altereds and Street Rods today, all based on vehicle and engines.  Currently, Altereds may start as sub-2000cc 4-cylinder engines such as the Formula F Ford Kent engine (AA or BB/AF and H/EA).  At the 1977 Winternationals in Pomona, California, more than 75 altereds contested for the Competition Eliminator title. Among them was Ed Prout, who brought his A/Altered from Connecticut. Yet by 1977, they had begun to be supplanted by Funny Car and Pro Stock. As late as that, however, John Lingenfelter was racing a B/Econo Altered (rebodied from Bob Glidden's 1976 Pro Stock car) in Comp Eliminator.  Richard Hartman, a crew chief for NHRA Funny Car driver Tim Wilkerson, rebodied a former Wilkerson Funny Car chassis into an Altered, reaching 4.92 seconds in the quarter-mile with a terminal velocity of 304.53 MPH.

A number of altereds drivers retired when NHRA eliminated the class, while others, like Geisler, moved to Funny Car. Some continued to run nostalgia, exhibition, or Competition Eliminator cars, such as Benjamin, who is now an owner.

Named cars 
Beaver Hunter, AA/FA, driven by Henry Harrison
Climax, AA/FA, driven by Ray Higley
High Heaven, AA/FA, driven by Cal Jackson
Instant T, FA, driven by Dennis Geisler
Lo Blow II, FA, driven by Tom Ferraro
Magnificent 7, AA/FA, driven by Leroy Chadderton
The Mob (Altered)|The Mob, AA/FA, driven by Ed Moore
Nanook, AA/FA, driven by Ed Moore
Pure Heaven, AA/FA, driven by Leon Fitzgerald
Pure Hell,  AA/FA,  driven by Dale Emery
Rat Trap, AA/FA, driven by Butch Pipins
The Savage, AA/FA, driven by Lee Lebaron
Walt's Puffer II, A/FA, driven by Walt Knoch, Jr.
Wild Cherry, A/Econo Altered, driven by Daniel Cyr
Wild Wild West, AA/FA, driven by Jimmy West
Winged Express, AA/FA, driven by "Wild Willie" Borsch
Yellow Submarine,  AA/FA, driven by Tim Perry

Notes

Sources 
McClurg, Bob. Diggers, Funnies, Gassers and Altereds: Drag Racing's Golden Age. North Branch, MN:  CarTech Inc, 2013.

Further reading 
Montgomery, Don. Those Wild Fuel Altereds: Drag Racing in the Sixties. Don Montgomery Publishing, 1997.

Drag racing classes